A Poncet Platform or Poncet mount is a type of equatorial platform (a telescope mount that adds an additional polar axis to non-equatorial mounts) that uses a simple polar pivot and an inclined plane. The motion of the mount allows any device sitting on that platform to track the apparent motion of the stars in the night sky (diurnal motion). It is a highly suitable complement to Dobsonian telescope style altazimuth mounted telescopes in that it follows the design's philosophy of being easy to build using common materials without the need for specialized tools or machined parts.

Origins and usage
The Poncet Platform was invented in the 1970s by Adrien Poncet. Poncet's original design was a very simple type of equatorial platform that uses pivot as one support and an inclined plane in line with the Earth's equator along which two other supports slide. It was publicized in the January 1977 issue of Sky & Telescope magazine. The model Poncet demonstrated was very simple plywood construction, using a nail pivot and a Formica covered inclined plane with plastic 35mm film canisters as the platforms bearing feet, on which he mounted a 6" newtonian telescope. The mount in its basic form is very simple, requiring just hand tools and common materials to build, with the only precise calculation being setting the angle of the inclined plane to match the angle of the Celestial equator. It has been used to add equatorial tracking to everything from small cameras to entire observatory buildings. Its simple design and low profile has made it a useful "retrofit" for altazimuth mounted telescopes such as the popular Dobsonian telescope. Users simply place their telescope on top of it to get the added feature of tracking in the direction of right ascension accurate enough for work at higher magnification or astrophotography.

Poncet Platforms do have design limitations. They are usually designed to track for 1 hour (15° of tilt) since longer tracking could cause the instrument on top of it to topple off. After that hour the mount has to be pivoted back to the east to reset the clock drive mechanism. Since the Poncet platform has no roller bearing surfaces that can be driven, the clock drive mechanism itself has posed some design difficulty for telescope makers. Straight line drives such as threaded nut/bolt drives change drive rate when converted to a circular motion. It is also time consuming to reset via spinning the nut back to the starting point. Amateurs have tackled this by employing curved bolt designs and even using specially shaped cams to convert the straight line motion to a variable speed motion. High mechanical loadings from heavy telescopes or using them at low geographic latitudes can cause the mount to bind up, requiring more complicated improved bearing surfaces to overcome this. This has led to equatorial platform variations based on the Poncet design include Alan Gee's platform mount using a more complicated cylindrical bearing surface in place of the inclined plane, and Georges D'Autume's platform design which uses a sophisticated conical bearing system.

See also
List of telescope parts and construction
List of telescope types

References

External links
 equatorial platform

Optical telescope components